Kristopher B. Jones is an American author and businessman. He has founded several companies, including Pepperjam, ReferLocal.com, LSEO.com, and KBJ Capital. Jones is also the author of Search Engine Optimization: Your Visual Blueprint for Effective Internet Marketing.

Education
Jones is a holder of a BA from the Pennsylvania State University, an MS from Villanova University, and a JD from Albany Law School.

Businesses
In 1999 Jones founded Internet marketing agency and affiliate network Pepperjam, serving as CEO and president of both. In 2009 Jones entered negotiations with GSI Commerce (later eBay Enterprises) in order to sell Pepperjam, agreeing to a price during a meeting with the company's CEO Michael Rubin. Following this, Jones founded and serves as managing partner of KBJ Capital.

He then founded and acts as the CEO of ReferLocal.com. He also co-created the "French Girls App". French Girls App raised $685,000 from investors, including Christina Milian and Larry English.

In 2014 Jones founded LSEO.com, a dashboard and scoring system, which provides feedback on various steps taken by clients towards their SEO. Jones has been named the Entrepreneur of the Year by Bank of America, and a finalist for the Ernst and Young Entrepreneur of the Year in Greater Philadelphia.

In 2017 Jones and his partner Damon Wayans Jr. appeared on the series Planet of the Apps to pitch their gig booking app Special Guest, which allows users to book live entertainment directly with performers rather than through bookings agencies, in a one-hour episode. They received $1.5 million in funding in the end from the panel of investors.

Writing
Jones has been a contributor to TechCrunch. He is the author of the book Search Engine Optimization: Your Visual Blueprint for Effective Internet Marketing, published in 2008. Carsten Cumbrowski, writing for Search Engine Journal, said of the book that, "One of the unique aspects of the book is … how it is designed. It is geared towards the visual folks like myself and uses a tremendous amount of pictures to show things instead of just using words to explain. Virtually every page has a screenshot or illustration and is an integrated part of the book, beyond the simple use as decoration or reinforcement of the written text."

References

External links
 Official website

Living people
Pennsylvania State University alumni
Villanova University alumni
Albany Law School alumni
Year of birth missing (living people)